Smoky River Serenade is a 1947 American Western film directed by Derwin Abrahams and written by Barry Shipman. The film stars Paul Campbell, Ruth Terry, Guinn "Big Boy" Williams, Virginia Hunter, Carolina Cotton and Cottonseed Clark. The film was released on August 21, 1947, by Columbia Pictures.

Plot

Cast          
Paul Campbell as Jack Norman
Ruth Terry as Sue Greeley
Guinn "Big Boy" Williams as Wagon Wheel 
Virginia Hunter as Wilda Moore
Carolina Cotton as Carolina
Cottonseed Clark as Cottonseed Clark
Paul E. Burns as Pop Robinson
Russell Hicks as J. Bricket Armstrong
Emmett Vogan as Sam Givins
Michael Towne as Photographer
Sandy Sanders as Chuck Mason
Lulu Mae Bohrman as Mrs. White
Ken Trietsch as Hoosier Hotshot Ken
Paul Trietsch as Hoosier Hotshot Hezzie
Charles Ward as Hoosier Hotshot Gabe
Gil Taylor as Hoosier Hotshot Gil
M.H. Richman as Ace 
J.D. Sumner as J. D. 
Eddie Wallace as Eddie 
Freddie Daniel as Freddie
Texas Rose Bascom as trick roper

References

External links
 

1947 films
American Western (genre) films
1947 Western (genre) films
Columbia Pictures films
Films directed by Derwin Abrahams
American black-and-white films
1940s English-language films
1940s American films